Petar Alyoshev Petrov (born 11 May 1987) is a Bulgarian football defender.

Career
Alyoshev had previously played for Lokomotiv Mezdra, Botev Vratsa, Slavia Sofia, Lyubimets 2007 and Chernomorets Burgas. In July 2017, he returned to Botev Vratsa but left the club at the end of the season.

References

External links
 
 

1987 births
Living people
People from Vratsa
Bulgarian footballers
PFC Lokomotiv Mezdra players
FC Botev Vratsa players
PFC Slavia Sofia players
FC Lyubimets players
PFC Chernomorets Burgas players
FC Oborishte players
PFC Ludogorets Razgrad II players
First Professional Football League (Bulgaria) players
Second Professional Football League (Bulgaria) players
Association football defenders